Etai or ETAI may refer to:

 Ethyltrifluoromethylaminoindane (ETAI), a psychoactive drug and research chemical
 Electronic Transactions on Artificial Intelligence (ETAI), a scientific journal
 Etai, an early name of Eagle (ship)

People
 Etai Pinkas (born 1973), Israeli LGBT leader
 Etai Yamada (1900–1999), head priest of the Japanese Tendai school of Mahayana Buddhism

See also
 Itai, Hebrew given name